Li Ting may refer to:

 Li Ting (diver) (born 1987), Chinese female diver
 Li Ting (tennis, born 1980), Chinese female tennis player
 Li Ting (canoeist) (born 1985), Chinese sprint canoer
 Li Ting (sitting volleyball) (born 1989), Chinese sitting volleyball player 
 Li Ting (tennis, born 1991), Chinese female tennis player